Paico is one of 11 districts of the Sucre Province in the Ayacucho region in Peru.

Population
The population of Paico (2005 census) is 978 people, 507 men and 471 women.

Ethnic groups 
The people in the district are mainly indigenous citizens of Quechua descent. Quechua is the language which the majority of the population (80.74%) learnt to speak in childhood, 18.81% of the residents started speaking using the Spanish language (2007 Peru Census).

Administrative division
The populated places in the district are:
 Paico
 Sihui
 Santa Cruz de Ccarmencca
 Charamarca
 Pallccapampa (Ccalluri)
 Layrata
 Anchani
 Ccochapata
 Ccasahuasi
 Analayocc
 Santarccocha

References